Louis Adolphe Billy (October 13, 1834 in Gentilly, Lower Canada – March 20, 1907) was a Quebec born politician and lawyer. He was elected to the House of Commons of Canada in 1882 as a Member of the Conservative Party to represent the riding of Rimouski.

External links
 

1834 births
1907 deaths
Conservative Party of Canada (1867–1942) MPs
Members of the House of Commons of Canada from Quebec
People from Centre-du-Québec